Alexyar Carolina Cañas García (born 5 December 1996) is a Venezuelan footballer who plays as a midfielder for Ecuadorian Super Liga Femenina club Carneras UPS. She was a member of the Venezuela women's national team.

Club career
Cañas is a former player of Zamora FC. She signed for Cortuluá in September 2018.

International career
Cañas represented Venezuela at the 2015 South American U-20 Women's Championship and the 2016 FIFA U-20 Women's World Cup. At senior level, she played the 2014 Central American and Caribbean Games. She was also selected for the 2018 Copa América Femenina, but did not play.

International goals
Scores and results list Venezuela's goal tally first

References

1996 births
Living people
Women's association football midfielders
Women's association football defenders
Venezuelan women's footballers
Footballers from Caracas
Venezuela women's international footballers
Competitors at the 2014 Central American and Caribbean Games
Asociación Civil Deportivo Lara players
América de Cali footballers
Zamora FC players
Santa Teresa CD players
Cortuluá footballers
Barcelona S.C. footballers
Venezuelan expatriate women's footballers
Venezuelan expatriate sportspeople in Colombia
Expatriate women's footballers in Colombia
Venezuelan expatriate sportspeople in Spain
Expatriate women's footballers in Spain
Venezuelan expatriate sportspeople in Ecuador
Expatriate women's footballers in Ecuador